William John Baird (March 18, 1884 – December 4, 1968) was a Canadian professional ice hockey player in the early 1900s. He was one of the first professionals in the sport of ice hockey. Born in Ottawa, Ontario, Canada, he played for the Ottawa Senators, Haileybury Comets, Pittsburgh Pros, Waterloo Colts and Galt.

Playing career
At the age of 19, Baird first left Ottawa to pursue his hockey career in Pittsburgh, Pennsylvania with the Pittsburgh Athletic Club of the Western Pennsylvania Hockey League (WPHL) in 1903–04. In 1904–05, he joined the Pittsburgh Professionals of the International Hockey League (IHL) for which he played on and off for the next three seasons. He played in several cities over the next three seasons, including stops with Portage la Prairie, Manitoba and his hometown with the Ottawa Senators in 1906–07. In 1907–08, he played the season with the Winnipeg Strathconas of the Manitoba Professional Hockey League (MPHL). In 1908–09, he returned east, playing in Ottawa with the Ottawa Aberdeens and with Haileybury of the Temiscaming Professional Hockey League (TPHL). He played his final two seasons in the Ontario Professional Hockey League, with Waterloo and Galt. While with Galt, he played in their 1911 Stanley Cup challenge against the Senators. He died at an Ottawa hospital on December 4, 1968, and is buried at Pinecrest Cemetery.

References

1884 births
1972 deaths
Ice hockey people from Ottawa
Ottawa Senators (original) players
Canadian ice hockey defencemen